The Belgium national rugby sevens team participates in international rugby sevens competitions. In 2014, the team participated in the Sevens Grand Prix Series, attaining sixth place which is their best result. Belgium was relegated to the 2018 Rugby Europe Sevens Trophy after the 2017 Grand Prix.

European Sevens Championship 2008 
Group B matches:

References 

Rugby union in Belgium
Belgium national rugby union team
National rugby sevens teams